Kong Xuan is a peacock spirit who became King Zhou’s general in the novel Fengshen Yanyi. His character is based on Mahamayuri from Buddhist myth.

When the evil King Zhou, the last ruler of the Shang dynasty, was rebelled against by his former subordinate King Wu, General Kong Xuan fought the rebel army in the Golden Cock Range.

Kong Xuan had five different rays of light which would sweep his enemy into a void, thus he gave King Wu's armies a hard time. Even King Wu's mightiest generals such as Nezha and Yang Jian (Erlang Shen) were no match against him.

However, in the end, Kong Xuan was defeated by Candi, a Buddha from the west. He then reverted into his original form, a giant peacock, and became Candi's mount.

References

External links
http://atwww.archive.org/stream/TheDictionaryOfChineseDeitites/DictionaryOfChineseDeities#page/n11/mode/2up-brief description about Kong Xuan
http://www.poisonpie.com/words/others/somewhat/creation/text/outline.html-Fengshen Yanyi (Creation of the Gods synopsis, Kong Xuan), appeared in chapter 68-71
 Wikisource:portal:Investiture_of_the_Gods/Chapter_70 synopsis of Fengshen Yanyi

Investiture of the Gods characters